Eddie Pequenino (1928–2000) was an Argentine film actor. Widely considered the father and founder of Argentine Rock. In 1956 he formed the first rock and roll band in Argentina and made the first recordings of that genre in the country.  He integrated the Clan Club.  He directed the orchestra of the Sunday television program for youth.  He participated with Mariano Mores in the first mega-show held in Argentina, Buenos Aires Sing to the World.  He starred in the famous sketch The hairdresser of Don Mateo.  Accompanied the comedian Alberto Olmedo in the program No touch button.  He worked as an actor in twenty films.  In 1965 he received the Martín Fierro Prize as the revelation of the year.

Selected filmography
 Venga a bailar el rock (1957)
 Would You Marry Me? (1967)
 Barbarian Queen (1985)

References

Bibliography 
 Peter Cowie & Derek Elley. World Filmography: 1967. Fairleigh Dickinson University Press, 1977.

External links 
 

1928 births
2000 deaths
Argentine male film actors
People from Buenos Aires